Pharping Hydro Power Project is the first hydro-power project of Nepal and second of Asia. It is situated in Kathmandu district. In 2010, it was declared a Living Museum by government of Nepal and was open for public.

History
Pharping Hydro Power was established in 1911 AD as Chandrajyoti Hydro-electric power station  by Prime Minister Chandra Shamsher Jang Bahadur Rana.Plant was inaugurated by King Prithvi Bir Bikram Shah Dev on Monday, 22 May, 1911 at around 6: 30 Pm by turning the lights  on during a program in Tudhikhel, Kathmandu.

Reservoir
Currently water from the reservoir lake is  used  for drinking water supply for Lalitpur District. Water is supplied to places like Bhaisepati, Sainbu, Kupondole, etc.

Nepal Electricity Authority
Nepal Electricity Authority took over Chandrajyoti Hydro-electric Power Station and renamed it Pharping Hydro Power Station and had since been smoothly running the power station till the late 1990s when it was considered that the aging power station needed to be converted into a heritage site. In 2010, it was declared a Living Museum by government of Nepal and was open for public.

See also
Hydroelectricity
List of power stations in Nepal

References

Hydropower organizations
Kathmandu District
Energy in Nepal
1911 establishments in Nepal